John Aston or Eston (fl. 1362–1391) was an English politician.

He was a Member (MP) of the Parliament of England for Leominster in 1362, Dartmouth in 1365, and Barnstaple in 1391.

References

Year of birth missing
Year of death missing
English MPs 1362
English MPs 1365
English MPs 1391
Members of the Parliament of England (pre-1707) for Barnstaple